Nedre Bardu Chapel is a chapel of the Church of Norway in Bardu Municipality in Troms og Finnmark county, Norway. It is an annex chapel for the Bardu parish which is part of the Senja prosti (deanery) in the Diocese of Nord-Hålogaland. The brown, wooden chapel was built in a long church style in 1981 using plans drawn up by the architect Eva Østgård. The chapel seats about 120 people.

See also
List of churches in Nord-Hålogaland

References

Bardu
Churches in Troms
Wooden churches in Norway
20th-century Church of Norway church buildings
Churches completed in 1981
1981 establishments in Norway
Long churches in Norway